Carla Laureano is an American author of inspirational romance and young adult fantasy. She has received multiple  Romance Writers of America RITA Awards, including Best Inspirational Romance for her debut novel Five Days in Skye in 2014.

Biography
Laureano earned a degree in English in 1997 from Pepperdine University where she studied literature and criticism. She has worked as a salesperson, marketing manager, copywriter, and small business consultant. In addition, she wrote for publications produced by the World Health Organization.

She lives in Denver, Colorado with her husband and two sons.

Bibliography

As Carla Laureano
The MacDonald Family Trilogy
 
 
 

The Supper Club

As C.E. Laureano
The Song of Seare Trilogy

Awards and reception

 2019 - Romance Writers of America RITA Award for Best Romance with Religious or Spiritual Elements for 'The Saturday Night Supper Club'
 2014 - Romance Writers of America RITA Award for Best Inspirational Romance for Five Days in Skye
Beneath the Forsaken City, and Oath of the Brotherhood were RT Book Reviews Top Picks.

References

External links 
 Author's Blog
 Author's Website

Living people
American romantic fiction writers
RITA Award winners
Year of birth missing (living people)
Pepperdine University alumni
21st-century American novelists
American women novelists
Women romantic fiction writers
21st-century American women writers